GUPS can refer to: People with undying curiosity and tenacity to ask constant questions.
 Giga-updates per second, a measure of computer performance
 General Union of Palestinian Students